Hypocladia is a genus of moths in the subfamily Arctiinae erected by George Hampson in 1898.

Species
 Hypocladia calita Dognin, 1911
 Hypocladia elongata Druce, 1905
 Hypocladia militaris Butler, 1877
 Hypocladia parcipuncta Hampson, 1909
 Hypocladia restricta Hampson, 1901

References

External links

Arctiinae